Lato was an ancient city of Crete, the ruins of which are located approximately 3 km from the village of Kritsa.

History 

The Dorian city-state was built in a defensible position overlooking Mirabello Bay between two peaks, both of which became acropolises to the city. Although the city probably predates the arrival of the Dorians, the ruins date mainly from the Dorian period (5th and 4th centuries BCE).  The city was destroyed c. 200 BCE, but its port (Lato Etera or Lato pros Kamara), located near Agios Nikolaos was in use during Roman rule. This has led to the confusion, repeated by Stephanus of Byzantium quoting Xenion, a Cretan historian, that Kamara and Lato were one and the same.  Modern scholarship distinguishes the two.

The city most likely was named after the goddess Leto (of which Lato is the usual Doric form) and may be mentioned in Linear B tablets as RA-TO.  Lato also minted coins in antiquity, bearing the likeness of the goddess Eileithyia who appears to have been the one particularly worshipped at Lato.

Nearchus, admiral of Alexander the Great, was born at Lato.

In 1894–96, A. Evans conducted a small-scale investigation. Systematic excavation started in 1899–1901 by the French School of Archaeology, with J. Demargne, was resumed in 1968 by P. Ducrey, O. Picard, and B. Chatzimichali, and lasted until the 1970s.

See also

Lato pros Kamara
Magasa

References

Martha W. Baldwin Bowsky, Portrait of a Polis: Lato Pros Kamara (Crete) in the Late Second Century B. C., Hesperia, Vol. 58, No. 3 (July - September 1989), pp. 331–47
Greek Ministry of Culture
Tourism website of the area
Tourism website of the area

Geography of Crete
Cretan city-states
Ruins in Greece
Populated places in ancient Crete
Former populated places in Greece
Ancient Greek archaeological sites in Crete